Chapeh Zad (also Romanized as Chapeh Zād; also known as Chapeh Zāt) is a village in Shanderman Rural District, Shanderman District, Masal County, Gilan Province, Iran. At the 2006 census, its population was 552, in 126 families.

References 

Populated places in Masal County